C2C12 is an immortalized mouse myoblast cell line. The C2C12 cell line is a subclone of myoblasts that were originally obtained by Yaffe and Saxel at the Weizmann Institute of Science in Israel in 1977. Developed for in vitro studies of myoblasts isolated from the complex interactions of in vivo conditions, C2C12 cells are useful in biomedical research. These cells are capable of rapid proliferation under high serum conditions and differentiation into myotubes under low serum conditions. Mononucleated myoblasts can later fuse to form multinucleated myotubes under low serum conditions or starvation, leading to the precursors of contractile skeletal muscle cells in the process of myogenesis. C2C12 cells are used to study the differentiation of myoblasts, osteoblasts, and myogenesis, to express various target proteins, and to explore mechanistic biochemical pathways.

Morphology 
Wild-type C2C12 cells have a radial branching morphology consisting of long fibers extending in many directions. C2C12 cells can be cultured in a variety of conditions to induce specific responses of interest. For example, assisted by the cell line's high differentiation rate and fusion rate, fibronectin templates can be micro-plated to petri dishes or cell culture flasks in order to induce specific growth patterns, such as that of skeletal muscle cell interactions with extracellular matrix components. The introduction of adhesion molecules can alter the growth pattern of C2C12 cells to a longitudinal distribution exhibiting polarity. There are many ways to regulate the shape of C2C12 myoblasts genetically and environmentally, from stress, to cytoskeleton alteration, to growth factors. The scaffolding of C2C12 cells is particularly important for studying muscle tissue regeneration post-injury or after tissue wasting due to disease or ICU rehabilitation.

Uses in Research 
C2C12 cells have been shown to effectively incorporate exogenous cDNA and nucleic acids by transfection. In the piloting research originally conducted by Yaffe and Saxel, C2C12 were obtained through serial passage of myoblasts cultured from the thigh muscle of C3H mice after crush injury. In their study, a set of C2C12 cells were cultured from normal mouse myoblasts, which were cultured from 2-month old C3H mice after crush injury. Within two days, the normal cells differentiated into spindle-shaped mononucleated myoblasts. After four days, multinucleated myotube networks formed, and a few days after, sarcomeres and Z-lines could be observed. In contrast, the dystrophic cells formed shortened fibers covered in fibroblasts, a hallmark of muscle wasting.

C2C12 cells demonstrate rapid development and maturation into functional skeletal muscle cells or cardiac muscle cells, having the ability to contract and generate force. The rate of muscle formation from C2C12 cells can be controlled by the introduction of loss-of-functions genes vital for the fusion of myoblasts and myogenesis. Under necrotic conditions, such as tumor necrosis factor alpha (TNF-α), direct protein loss, particularly myosin heavy chain protein, in C2C12 skeletal muscle cells has been shown. C2C12 cells were used to elucidate inactivated X chromosome (Xi) replication during early S-phase of the cell cycle and is regulated epigenetically. C2C12 cells are especially convenient for studying the cell cycle due to its high division rate.

References

External links
Cellosaurus entry for C2C12
ATCC Sales Page for C2C12

Rodent cell lines
Myoblasts